is a passenger railway station in located in the city of Shima,  Mie Prefecture, Japan, operated by the private railway operator Kintetsu Railway.

Lines
Ugata Station is served by the Shima Line, and is located 62.8 rail kilometers from the terminus of the line at Ise-Nakagawa Station.

Station layout
The station was consists of a single island platform in an elevated station building.

Platforms

Adjacent stations

History
Ugata Station opened on July 23, 1929 as a station on the Shima Electric Railway. The line was one of six private companies consolidated into Mie Kotsu by order of the Japanese government on February 11, 1944. When Mie Kotsu dissolved on February 1, 1964, the station became part of the Mie Electric Railway, which was then acquired by Kintetsu on April 1, 1965. The station building was rebuilt in March 1994.

Passenger statistics
In fiscal 2019, the station was used by an average of 960 passengers daily (boarding passengers only).

Surrounding area
Shima City Hall
Goza Shirahama beach
Shima tourism information center

See also
List of railway stations in Japan

References

External links

 Kintetsu: Ugata Station

Railway stations in Mie Prefecture
Railway stations in Japan opened in 1929
Stations of Kintetsu Railway
Shima, Mie